The 2021 chess calendar was again disrupted by the COVID-19 pandemic, but major events that took place included the Tata Steel Chess Tournament, won by Jorden van Foreest. 

The Candidates Tournament 2020–21, disrupted by the pandemic, concluded on 27 April 2021. It was won by Ian Nepomniachtchi.

In November, Nepomniachtchi subsequently faced defending champion Magnus Carlsen for the World Chess Championship title in Dubai, UAE during Expo 2020. Carlsen won the match 7–3 to retain the title with three games to spare and become a five-time world champion.

The International Chess Federation, FIDE, admitted four new member federations: Dominica, St. Vincent and Grenadines, Niger, and Belize.

2021 tournaments 
This is a list of significant 2021 chess tournaments:

Supertournaments

FIDE Events

Team events

Rapid & Biltz Tournaments

Deaths
 14 January – Yrjö Rantanen
 15 January – Gildardo García
 18 January – Lubomir Kavalek
 13 March – Nikola Spiridonov
 1 June – Román Hernández Onna
 1 July – Yury Dokhoian
 28 July – István Csom
 18 August – Evgeny Sveshnikov
 11 October – Boris Pineda
 14 November – Marek Vokáč
 19 December – Boško Abramović
 31 December – Gábor Kállai

References

 
21st century in chess
Chess by year
2021 sport-related lists